Chopped After Hours is an American cooking show on the Food Network, hosted by Ted Allen.

Format 
A spin-off of Chopped, this show features a similar format with mandatory ingredients and time restriction. Episodes consist of three segments, each featuring the judges from a different Chopped episode. The judges are given one of that episode's mystery ingredient baskets and must cook a dish that incorporates them. No one is eliminated or declared the winner; instead, the judges and Ted Allen taste each other's dishes and comment on them.

Episodes 
 All episode titles include the word "and".

Season 1

Season 2

Season 3

References

External links 
 Official site
 

2010s American cooking television series
2015 American television series debuts
American television spin-offs
English-language television shows
Food Network original programming